Mikhail Abelovich Kaufman (1897 – March 11, 1980) was a Russian cinematographer and photographer. He was the younger brother of filmmaker Dziga Vertov (Denis Kaufman) and the older brother of cinematographer Boris Kaufman.

He was born into a family of Jewish intellectuals living in Białystok in Grodno Governorate, at the time when the Białystok region was a part of the Russian Empire. 

In the 1920s, after Mikhail Kaufman returned from the Russian Civil War, Vertov offered him the opportunity to participate in his newsreel series Kino-Pravda as a cameraman. 

Mikhail Kaufman directed photography for several films, including Vertov's Man with the Movie Camera (1929). The film is built around meta-reference and is full of innovative visual effects: in it, Kaufman acts as a cameraman and is seen shooting the film while walking on high bridges, hanging off the side of a train, climbing a smokestack and crawling underground with miners – all in order to get the best shot. His brother's wife, Yelizaveta Svilova, was editor and part of the "Council of Three" who "proclaimed a 'death sentence' on the cinema that came before, faulting it for mixing in 'foreign matter' from theater and literature.

Mikhail Kaufman directed two films: Moscow (1927) and In Spring (1929). Shortly after the filming of Man with the Movie Camera, Kaufman and Vertov fell out over artistic differences. The two would never work together again.

Kaufman died in Moscow.

References

External links

 
 The Man with a Movie Camera at nottingham.ac.uk
 The man with the movie camera. Speed of vision, speed of truth? by MARKO DANIEL
 Stills from The Man with the Movie [pl:MCamera

1897 births
1980 deaths
People from Białystok
People from Belostoksky Uyezd
Jews from the Russian Empire
Soviet cinematographers
Soviet photographers